Bathytasmania is a genus of marine annelids in the family Polynoidae (scale worms). The only species, Bathytasmania insolita, is known from a single specimen collected at 4395m in the Tasman Sea south of Tasmania, Australia.

Description 
Bathytasmania has 19 segments and 10 pairs of elytra. A median antenna is present but lateral antennae are absent. Bidentate neurochaetae are absent and The first segment lacks chaetae.

References 

Phyllodocida
Polychaete genera